Karagay-Yurt (Qarağayyort) is a rural locality (a village) in Ishlinsky Selsoviet, Beloretsky District, Bashkortostan, Russia. The population was 66 as of 2010. There are 3 streets.

Geography 
Karagay-Yurt is located 39 km west of Beloretsk (the district's administrative centre) by road. Uluyelga is the nearest rural locality.

References 

Rural localities in Beloretsky District